Sabyndykol is a lake in Bayanaul District, Pavlodar Region, Kazakhstan.

The lake lies by the town of Bayanaul, located on the northern shore. Sabyndykol falls within the perimeter of the Bayanaul National Park, a protected area.

Geography
Sabyndykol lies in a small tectonic depression of the Kazakh Uplands, just below the slopes of Bayanaul Range, to the south of the eastern part of the mountains.

The water of Sabyndykol is fresh. There are no big rivers flowing into the lake, only intermittent streams, the largest of which has its mouth in the northwestern shore.
The eastern shore is sandy and gently sloping.

Flora and fauna 
The flat sections of the shoreline are overgrown with reeds. The main fish species found in the lake are pike, roach, tench and perch, but not in great numbers.

See also
List of lakes of Kazakhstan

References

External links

«Добро пожаловать в Казахстан». Связано ли название озера Сабындыколь с красавицей Баян сулу?
Lake Sabyndykol / Сабындыкөл / Озеро Сабындыколь

Lakes of Kazakhstan
Pavlodar Region

kk:Сабындыкөл